Cerro Ejido is a suburb of the city of Artigas in the Artigas Department of northern Uruguay.

Geography
It is located at the south urban limits of the city. The populated fragments of San Eugenio and Cerro Signorelli lie to its west and the suburb Pintadito lies to its south. Route 30 passes a small distance to the east of these suburbs.

Population
In 2011 Cerro Ejido had a population of 790 inhabitants.
 
Source: Instituto Nacional de Estadística de Uruguay

References

External links
INE map of Artigas, Pintadito, Cerro Ejido, Cerro Signorelli and Cerro San Eugenio

Populated places in the Artigas Department